Dolichoderus rohweri is an extinct species of ant in the genus Dolichoderus. Described by Carpenter in 1930, the fossils of this species are only found in the Florissant Formation, Colorado.

References

†
Fossil taxa described in 1930
†
Fossil ant taxa
Florissant Formation